Amy Platten (born 27 October 2000) is an English international judoka. She has represented England at the Commonwealth Games and won a bronze medal.

Biography
Platten was the European Youth Olympic Festival champion in 2017 and won a bronze medal at the 2021 European Under-23 Championships. Also in 2021, she became champion of Great Britain, winning the light-heavyweight division at the British Judo Championships.

In 2022, she was selected for the 2022 Commonwealth Games in Birmingham, where she competed in the women's -48 kg, winning the bronze medal.

References

External links
 
 

2000 births
Living people
English female judoka
British female judoka
Judoka at the 2022 Commonwealth Games
Commonwealth Games competitors for England
Commonwealth Games bronze medallists for England
Commonwealth Games medallists in judo
21st-century English women
Medallists at the 2022 Commonwealth Games